The Leitha Limestone is a geologic formation in Austria, Czech Republic, Hungary and Poland. It preserves fossils dating back to the Middle to Late Miocene period.

Fossil content 
Various fossils have been found in the formation:

 Aetobatis irregularis
 Araloselachus cuspidata
 Carcharias (Hypoprion) sp.
 Carcharias (Aprionodon) cf. collata
 Carcharodon hastalis
 Cetotherium priscum
 Coris sigismundi
 Eugaleus latus
 Galeocerdo aduncus
 Galeus aduncus
 Galeus cf. canis
 Halitherium schinzii
 Heterodelphis leiodontus
 Hemipristis serra
 Isurus desorii
 Kentriodon fuchsii
 Megalodon
 Metaxytherium medium
 Myliobatis cf. meridionalis
 Notidanus primigenius
 Odontaspis acutissima
 Odontaspis macrota
 Oxyrhina xyphodon
 Pachyacanthus suessii
 Prionodon sp.
 Raja sp.
 Sparus sp.
 Symphodus westneati
 Wainwrightilabrus agassizi

See also 
 List of fossiliferous stratigraphic units in Austria
 List of fossiliferous stratigraphic units in Czech Republic
 List of fossiliferous stratigraphic units in Poland

References 

Geologic formations of Austria
Geologic formations of the Czech Republic
Geologic formations of Hungary
Geologic formations of Poland
Miocene Series of Europe
Neogene Austria
Neogene Czech Republic
Neogene Poland
Langhian
Serravallian
Limestone formations
Reef deposits
Fossiliferous stratigraphic units of Europe
Paleontology in Austria
Paleontology in Hungary
Paleontology in Poland